, often abbreviated , is a Japanese animation studio and light novel publisher located in Uji, Kyoto Prefecture. It was founded in 1985 by husband and wife Hideaki and Yoko Hatta, who remain its president and vice-president respectively.

Kyoto Animation has produced anime films and series including The Melancholy of Haruhi Suzumiya (2006), Clannad (2007), K-On! (2009), Free! (2013), Sound! Euphonium (2015), A Silent Voice (2016), and Violet Evergarden (2018).

History

Kyoto Animation was co-founded in 1985 by married couple Yoko and Hideaki Hatta; it became a limited company in 1985 and a corporation in 1999. Yoko Hatta, who serves as the company's vice president, had worked as a painter at Mushi Production until she moved to Kyoto after marrying her husband, who serves as president. The company's logo originates from the kanji kyō, the first character of Kyoto.

Since 2009, Kyoto Animation has hosted the annual Kyoto Animation Awards in three categories: original novels, manga, and scenarios. Some winning submissions are published under the company's KA Esuma Bunko imprint, and have a chance of being later adapted as anime. Love, Chunibyo & Other Delusions, Free!, Beyond the Boundary and Myriad Colors Phantom World were based on novels that received an honorable mention in this competition. In 2014, the novel Violet Evergarden became the first and only work so far to win a grand prize in any of the three categories.

Kyoto Animation has become recognized for its high production values and "sensitivity to the wonders and quandaries of ordinary life". Unlike most animation studios, the company's employees are salaried rather than freelance workers, and are trained in-house. These practices have been cited as encouraging employees to focus on frame quality rather than production quotas. The company has received praise for the positive treatment of its staff, and was honored by Women in Animation with its Diversity Award in 2020 for its efforts in creating a gender-balanced workforce and encouraging women to enter the industry.

In April 2020, the company announced that it would put its work on hiatus for one month due to the COVID-19 pandemic, later extending the period to the end of May.

Animation Do
An affiliate company, was established in 2000 to assist production at Kyoto Animation. Originally established as the studio's Osaka office, it was incorporated as a limited company in 2000, then a corporation in 2010. Both companies are run by Hideaki Hatta and are run jointly as one. They produce up-and-coming works under the Animation Do label with Kyoto Animation as their main contractor and works where they work as one company alongside Kyoto Animation. They work on most Kyoto Animation projects and many of them have joint signatures. On September 16, 2020, it was announced by the National Printing Bureau's Kanpō publication that Kyoto Animation absorbed Animation Do, which includes all rights and associated properties.

2019 arson attack

On the morning of July 18, 2019, an arson fire at Kyoto Animation's first studio in Fushimi killed 36 people (including directors Yasuhiro Takemoto and Yoshiji Kigami), injured 34 others (including the suspect) in varying degrees, and destroyed most of the building's materials and computers. The suspect, 41-year-old Shinji Aoba, later admitted to committing the attack.

Productions 
In the tables below, only the productions for which Kyoto Animation was a lead producer are listed.

Anime television series

Anime films

Original video animations

Original net animations

Published light novels

Notes

References

Bibliography

Further reading

External links

  
 Animation Do official website 
 

 
Companies based in Kyoto Prefecture
Mass media companies established in 1981
Japanese companies established in 1981
Japanese animation studios
Mass media in Kyoto
Book publishing companies of Japan